Harjun stadion is an athletics and football stadium in Jyväskylä, Finland.  It is the home stadium of a local football club JJK that currently plays in Ykkönen.  The stadium holds 5,000 spectators and was opened in 1926.

References

External links
Stadium information  

Football venues in Finland
JJK Jyväskylä
Sports venues completed in 1926